Naimisaranyam, also known as Neemsar, Nimsar or Nimkhar, and the Naimishnath Devaraja temple, is a Hindu temple dedicated to Vishnu located in the north Indian state of Uttar Pradesh. It is one of the Divya Desams, the 108 temples of Vishnu revered in Nalayira Divya Prabandham by the 12 poet saints called the Alvars. The temple is believed to be of significant antiquity with contributions at different times from the ruling kings. The temple is counted as one of the eight temples of Vishnu that self-manifested and is classified as Swayamvyaktha Kshetra. The holy tank Chankra Kunda is associated with the temple and it is a pilgrimage centre where people take a holy dip during festive occasions.

Legend
Sage Narada is believed to have searched for the best tirtha (water body) in three worlds. He went to Kailasa, the abode of Shiva, then to Tirupparkatal (Kshira Sagara), the abode of Vishnu, and finally landed in the water body in the Naimisha Forest. The central deity is also believed to be worshipped by Sudhama and devas (celestial deities).

Indra, the king of the devas, was once driven out of Devaloka by an asura named Vritra. The asura was the recipient of a boon whereby he could not be killed by any weapon that was known till the date of his receiving the boon and additionally that no weapon made of wood or metal could harm him. Indra, who lost all hope of recovering his kingdom, went to seek the aid of Vishnu. Vishnu revealed to Indra that only the weapon made from the bones of the sage Dadhichi would defeat Vritra. Indra and the other devas therefore approached the sage, whom Indra had once beheaded, and asked him for his aid in defeating Vritra. Dadhichi acceded to the devas' request, but said that he wished that he had time to go on a pilgrimage to all the holy rivers before he gave up his life for them. Indra then brought together all the waters of the holy rivers to Naimisaranya, thereby allowing the sage to have his wish fulfilled without a further loss of time. Dadhichi is then said to have given up his life by the art of yoga after which the devas fashioned the Vajrayudha from his spine. This weapon was then used to defeat the asura, allowing Indra to reclaim his place as the king of Devaloka.

As told in another legend, when sages were planning to perform penance, Brahma, the god of creation, brought out a ring from darba grass. He asked the sages to perform penance at the place where the ring fell, which is believed to be Naimisaranya. The sages performed penance and at the end of it, Vishnu appeared to the sages and accepted their offerings. It is believed that the forest still has Vishnu and all sages as trees.

Architecture
Naimisaranyam is located at the junction of the roads from Sitapur and Khairabad, 32 km from Sitapur and 42 km from the Sandila railway station, 45 miles north of Lucknow in Uttar Pradesh. Naimisaranya is also known as Nimsar or Nimkhar and is located on the left bank of the river Gomati.
The sacred well, namely Chakra Kunda is believed to have started from the weapon of Vishnu, Chakra. There are shrines dedicated to Chakranarayana, Ganesha, Rama, and Lakshmana in the temple.

Religious significance

This place has also been visited by Sankaracharya and the famous poet, Surdas resided here. Sage Suta (or Maharshi Suta), the author of 18 puranas is believed to have lived here and presented his sayings to the sages. The central deity is believed to have presided over the forest and hence the puja (rituals) are done to the forest.

The temple is counted as one of the eight temples of Vishnu that self-manifested and is classified as Swayamvyakta Kshetra. (Seven other temples in the line are Srirangam Ranganathaswamy temple, Bhu Varaha Swamy temple, Tirumala Venkateshvara Temple, and Vanamamalai Perumal Temple in South India and Saligrama, Pushkar and Badrinath Temple in North India). Naimisaranya temple is revered in Naalayira Divya Prabandham, the 7th–9th century Vaishnava canon, by Thirumangai Alvar in ten hymns. The temple is classified as a Divya Desam, the 108 Vishnu temples that are revered in the Vaishnava canon.

Every new moon day, a large number of people purify themselves with a dip in the holy well.  If the new moon falls on a Monday, it is believed that a holy bath in the well and offering to the presiding deity Lalitha will wash away all the sins committed in their lifetime.
Naimisharanya Chakra Tirth is an anomaly as it is a river which flows in a circular motion, the water originates from an underground 
source and is mentioned in many of the Vedas.

See also
Naimiṣāraṇya
Divya Desam
Misrikh Neemsar

Notes

References

External links

 
Vishnu temples
Sitapur district